The 2002 IIHF World Championship Final was an ice hockey match that took place on May 11, 2002 in Göteborg, Sweden, to determine the winner of the 2002 IIHF World Championship. Slovakia defeated Russia to win its first championship.

Details

See also 
 2002 IIHF World Championship
 Slovakia men's national ice hockey team
 Russia men's national ice hockey team

References 
Official IIHF game report
Game report on hockeyarchives.info

IIHF World Championship Finals
Final
Russia men's national ice hockey team games
Slovakia men's national ice hockey team games
world
International sports competitions in Gothenburg
2000s in Gothenburg